Lanz may refer to:

Places 
 Lanz, Brandenburg, a municipality in Brandenburg, Germany
 a village in the municipality Störnstein in Bavaria, Germany
 Lanz, German name from Lomnice, a village in Sokolov District, Czech Republic
Lanz Peak in Antarctica 
Lanz Point, Saskatchewan, a hamlet in Canada
 Lanz and Cox Islands Provincial Park in British Columbia, Canada

Companies and brands 
 Heinrich Lanz AG, German pioneer and manufacturer of agricultural machinery from 1859 to 1956
 Lanz Bulldog, agricultural machinery
 Schütte-Lanz-Luftschiffe, rigid airships

Other 
 Lanz (surname)
 683 Lanzia, an asteroid in the Main Belt named after Heinrich Lanz
 700 Auravictrix, an asteroid in the Main Belt named after a Schütte-Lanz Zeppelin
 Order of the New Templars, founded by Lanz von Liebenfels
 Lanz, a character from Xenoblade Chronicles 3

See also
 Lantz (disambiguation)